Frederick Brent Grotrian (1838–1905) was an English Conservative Member of Parliament for Kingston upon Hull East constituency (1886–1892).

Biography
F. B. Grotian married Elizabeth Hunter in 1862, having eight children Ethel, Hilda, Bessie, Gwendolen, Frederick, Herbert (later Sir Herbert Brent Grotrian), Harold, and Edgar.

He was founder of the Hull Daily Mail (1889), member of the Hull Chamber of Commerce, and one of the founders of the Drypool and Marfleet Steam Tramways Company.

References

External links 
 

1838 births
1905 deaths
Politicians from Kingston upon Hull
Conservative Party (UK) MPs for English constituencies
UK MPs 1886–1892